Floats were a beverage line introduced by the Dr Pepper Snapple in January 2008. Two flavors were available, A&W Float and Sunkist Float. The purpose of the concept was to mimic the flavor of an ice cream float of a given soda. Thus, the A&W flavor was intended to taste like a root beer float, while the latter is comparable to an orange creamsicle or Sunkist float.

The drinks were creamy in nature and contained little carbonation, and no caffeine. Ingredients included skim milk, cream, and nitrous oxide to create foam. While it was recommended that they be served chilled, refrigeration of Floats is not mandatory. Available in 11.5-ounce, vintage soda-shop-inspired glass bottles with twist-off tops, Floats were sold at major US retail, grocery, and convenience stores.

Marketing
The product's first press release was issued on January 2, 2008, which included bottle design photos, suggested retail prices, and other information. 

In the press release, Andrew Springate, vice president of marketing, stated:
"For years, beverage makers have tried to crack the code and develop an indulgent drink that tastes like a homemade float... The A&W and Sunkist Floats are indulgent treats like nothing consumers have experienced before; one pour and your taste buds will be amazed - no work, no hassle."

References

External links
 Floats.com - Official Website

Products introduced in 2008
Ice cream brands
Orange sodas
Defunct brands
Root beer